Chloroclystis rubroviridis is a moth in the family Geometridae. It was described by Warren in 1896. It is found in the north-eastern Himalayas, Burma, Taiwan and on Borneo, Peninsular Malaysia and Java. The habitat consists of upper montane areas.

Subspecies
Chloroclystis rubroviridis rubroviridis (north-eastern Himalaya, Burma, Taiwan)
Chloroclystis rubroviridis nubifera Prout, 1932 (Borneo, Peninsular Malaysia, Java)

References

External links

Moths described in 1896
rubroviridis